Waqt Hamara Hai is a  1993 Indian romantic action comedy film. It was directed by Bharat Rangachary and produced by Sajid Nadiadwala. The stars were Akshay Kumar and Sunil Shetty, paired together for the first time.

Plot 

Vikas Sabkuchwala and Sunil Chaudhary is an two college students who repeatedly fails in his exams, much to the dismay of his father Dinanath Sabkuchwala. Dinanath is a miser. Vikas is in love with his colleague, Ayesha. Dinanath's accountant's nephew Sunil Chaudhary comes to Mumbai from Haryana for higher education. Sunil has been expelled from most of the colleges in Haryana due to his aggressive and violent nature. In Mumbai, his uncle gets him admitted into the same college as Vikas through Dinanath's recommendation. On the first day of his college term, his uncle dresses him up to make him look like a nerd so that he doesn't get into more fights. On his way to college, Sunil meets Mamta and helps her change her car's tyre by lifting up the car. Mamta is amazed by his strength and simplicity. In the college, Vikas tries to rag Sunil and in the canteen Sunil has a chat with Mamta, after which Sunil falls in love with Mamta. Vikas and Sunil have a gruesome fight one day but they become friends eventually when Sunil saves Vikas as he is about to fall from a building. Meanwhile, a group of terrorists led by Colonel Chikara are chased by the police and unwillingly leave a bag containing "Crypton", a nuclear missile product, in Vikas's car and flee. They eventually return to retrieve Crypton. Unable to find it, they kidnap Vikas and Ayesha and demand that Sunil deliver the product. Sunil finds Crypton and he leaves along with Mamta to deliver it. What happens later is what forms the crux of the story.
Vikas and Sunil escape from Chikara leaving Ayesha and Mamata to do some of Chikaras work.
After this they come back and kill quiet a few of Chikaras men and free Ayesha and Mamata.
They successfully save Netaji from dying and they foil Colonel Chikara's plans. In the end, Chikara dies and everybody is safe.

Cast
Akshay Kumar as Vikas Sabkuchwala  
Sunil Shetty as Sunil Chaudhary 
Ayesha Jhulka as Ayesha Vidhohi 
Mamta Kulkarni as Mamta Vidhohi 
Rami Reddy as Colonel Chikara
Aruna Irani as Shanti Sabkuchwala 
Anupam Kher as Dinanath Sabkuchwala 
Arun Bakshi as Munim 
Tiku Talsania as Tejas Raj Vidrohi
Shubha Khote as Chandramukhi Vidrohi
Viju Khote as Inspector Surajmukhi
Sudhir Dalvi as Netaji Ramgopal Verma
Gavin Packard as Sambo
Mahesh Anand as Major 
Ragesh Asthana as college friend of Vikas.
Guddi Maruti as college friend of Ayesha.

Soundtrack

The music of the film was composed Nadeem-Shravan and the lyrics were penned by Sameer. The soundtrack was released in 1993 on Audio Cassette and Audio CD in Tips Music and also released in serengetic sirrico Madein U.K. under licensed from tips music which consists of 7 songs. The full album is recorded by Asha Bhosle, Mohammed Aziz, Kumar Sanu, Udit Narayan, Vinod Rathod, Alka Yagnik, Kavita Krishnamurthy, Mitali Choudhary and Anupam Kher.

Reception 
The film was the first release of producer Sajid Nadiadwala after the death of his first wife, Divya Bharti. Therefore, it is dedicated to her memory. The film managed to do average business at the box-office.

References

External links 

 

1993 films
1990s Hindi-language films
Films scored by Nadeem–Shravan
Indian action comedy films
1993 action comedy films
Films about terrorism in India
Films directed by Bharat Rangachary